Dean Kaufert (born May 23, 1957) is a Wisconsin politician, legislator and business owner.

Born in Outagamie County, Wisconsin, Kaufert was a business owner and served on the Neenah, Wisconsin Common Council. Kaufert served in the Wisconsin State Assembly from 1991 to 2015. In 2014 Kaufert was elected Mayor of Neenah, Wisconsin.

References

1957 births
Living people
Politicians from Neenah, Wisconsin
People from Outagamie County, Wisconsin
University of Wisconsin–Stevens Point alumni
Mayors of places in Wisconsin
Wisconsin city council members
21st-century American politicians
Republican Party members of the Wisconsin State Assembly